Narthecusa tenuiorata is a moth of the family Geometridae first described by Francis Walker in 1862. This species is found from Sierra Leone to Angola.

Subspecies
Narthecusa tenuiorata perspersa L. B. Prout, 1931 (Nigeria)
Narthecusa tenuiorata zerenaria (Mabille, 1879) (Angola, Congo, Gabon)
Narthecusa tenuiorata nudalla (Bethune-Baker, 1913) (Angola)
Narthecusa tenuiorata melanthiata (Mabille, 1891) (Congo/Gabon)
Narthecusa tenuiorata tenuiorata Walker, 1862 (Ghana, Gabon, Angola)

References

External links
Africamuseum.be: images

Ennominae
Moths of Africa
Moths described in 1862